John Alan Maxwell (March 7, 1904 – April 13, 1984) was an American artist known primarily for his book and magazine illustrations, as well as historical paintings. He also was an illustrator for many commercial publications, including Collier's Weekly, The Saturday Evening Post, The Golden Book Magazine, The American Magazine, and Woman's Home Companion.

Early years and education

Maxwell was born in Roanoke, Virginia and raised in Johnson City, Tennessee, at 428 1/2 West Locust Street, the son of Arthur Clifford Maxwell and Bessie Mae (Ball) Maxwell. He was the oldest of five children, including Elizabeth Victoria Maxwell (Smedberg), Clifford Arthur Maxwell, Gladys Virginia Maxwell (McDaniel), and Julia Reeve Maxwell (Croasdell). He first married Stella Freeman. This marriage ended in the mid-1950s. He married Michele O'Hara in the 1960s.

Maxwell worked as a soda jerk in a drug store while attending Science Hill High School in Johnson City. At 16, he enrolled at the Corcoran School of Art in Washington, D.C. He continued his studies at the Art Students League of New York, where he studied under painter George Luks, a member of the Ashcan School of early twentieth-century American artists who often painted pictures of New York city life. One of his other teachers was noted book and magazine illustrator Frank Vincent DuMond, whose students also included Georgia O'Keeffe and Norman Rockwell.

Artistic career
By 1925, at the age of 21, Maxwell was illustrating for Collier's and Golden Book magazines and had established a studio at the famous Tenth Street Studio Building. at 51 West Tenth Street in New York, home to "artist entrepreneurs" for 98 years —artists from the Hudson River School to the American Impressionists — including such famous artists as Frederick E. Church, Albert Bierstadt, Winslow Homer, Sanford R. Gifford, John La Farge and William Merritt Chase.  The previous occupant of Maxwell's studio was the Lebanese artist, poet, and writer Kahlil Gibran.

By the early 1930s, Maxwell was illustrating for such noted writers as Christopher Morley, Sir Arthur Conan Doyle, Pearl S. Buck<ref>Pearl Buck's Portrait of Her Fighting Missionary Father, (New York Times, November 29, 1936.)</ref> and Edna Ferber.

His illustrations for Aldous Huxley's first novel, Sir Hercules and Lady Filomena, appeared in the April, 1931 issue of Golden Book magazine, the same year Huxley was writing Brave New World. His erotic drawings enhance Le Sage's Asmodeus, or The Devil on Two Sticks published in 1932 by the Bibliophilist Society.

In 1936, according to his 1984 obituary in the Johnson City Press Chronicle, he won first place in the Society of Illustrators competition in New York—and was named one of the top 10 illustrators in the country. A prolific illustrator, other authors for whom he illustrated include John Steinbeck, Joseph Conrad, F. Van Wyck Mason, Allan Eckert, Frank Yerby, James Street, Booth Tarkington, Frank Slaughter, and Thomas Costain. He maintained his studio at the Tenth Street Studio until it was demolished in 1956. Maxwell returned to Johnson City shortly thereafter, and continued to work at his studio at 428 West Locust Street until his death in 1984.

An illustration signed by Maxwell for the official theater poster for Ernest Hemingway's 1943 film For Whom the Bell Tolls, was sold on eBay in March, 2011.

Significance
While distinctions between artists and illustrators have not always favored the quiet work of the 20th century book and magazine illustrator, John Alan Maxwell was named one of the top ten illustrators in the country in 1936 by the Society of Illustrators in New York. He was described in a 1947 profile in American Artist magazine as the quintessential "illustrator of romance."

Maxwell illustrated multiple books and magazine serials for Pearl S. Buck for over a decade, including the portrait of the author's mother for the cover of the 1935 book, The Exile, and the companion portrait of her father for the cover of her 1936 book, Fighting Angel in addition to his illustrations of the serialized editions of these two books in Woman's Home Companion from 1935-1937. Mrs. Buck was the first American woman to be awarded both the Pulitzer Prize (1932) and Nobel Prize (1938) for literature, and these book illustrations are encased along with Buck's Nobel Prize in a glass case at the Green Hills Farm in Perkasie, Pennsylvania.

For the Doubleday Doran & Company, Maxwell illustrated a 1929 United States edition of The Adventures of the Scarlet Pimpernel by Baroness Emmuska Orczy, the British novelist, playwright and artist.

In a profile of Maxwell in the February, 1948 issue of Esquire Magazine, writer Robert U. Godsoe described the artist:

Maxwell was a contemporary of N.C. Wyeth, an important 20th century illustrator. Maxwell and Wyeth each illustrated five novels for Rafael Sabatini. Wyeth and Maxwell also both illustrated works for C. S. Forester's popular Horatio Hornblower series. Maxwell illustrated the dust jacket for the 1933 first edition of Hervey Allen's Anthony Adverse, followed by Wyeth's illustration of a 1934 edition of the same book. Both editions featured interior decorations by Allan McNab. Maxwell's 1933 dust jacket illustration re-appears as an embossed duotone on a bookbound edition of Anthony Adverse in 1936. This same illustration also appears on a 1933 wooden Arteno "Picture Puzzle" in full color. Wyeth and Maxwell both illustrated books for Charles Nordhoff and James Norman Hall, the authors of Mutiny on the Bounty (Wyeth) and No More Gas (Maxwell). No More Gas originally appeared in a c. 1939 Saturday Evening Post as Out of Gas. Today, Maxwell's original Alan Eckert illustrations also adorn recent reprint editions of Allan Eckert's novels, including THE FRONTIERSMEN, WILDERNESS EMPIRE and THE CONQUERORS. Maxwell was still illustrating books for Eckert when he died in 1984.

Partial List of Maxwell's works
 Hopper, James Marie, 1876-1956 Medals of honor, with illustrations by John Alan Maxwell
 Interior Artwork; Colliers Aug 13 '27 Loot • Albert Payson Terhune • ss; illus. John Alan Maxwell
 Interior Artwork; The Golden Book Magazine Apr '30
 The Flight to Varennes Part 2 of 4 • Alexandre Dumas; trans. by Richard S. Garnett • sl, 1930; illus. John Alan Maxwell
 Interior Artwork; The Golden Book Magazine Nov '30
 Mary, Queen of Scots • Charles Augustin Sainte-Beuve • bg (r); illus. John Alan Maxwell
 Cover Artist; The Golden Book Magazine Jul '35 Golden Book Magazine [v22 #127, July 1935] (Review of Reviews, 25¢, 128pp, small pulp, cover by John Alan Maxwell); Reprint magazine. [PSP]
 Cover Artist; The Golden Book Magazine Aug '35 Golden Book Magazine [v22 #128, August 1935] (Review of Reviews, 25¢, 128pp, small pulp, cover by John Alan Maxwell); Partial contents from EBAY auction.
 Interior Artwork; Ladies Home Journal Oct '36 Fair Day • Ruth Burr Sanborn • ss; illus. John Alan Maxwell
 Interior Artwork; Colliers Aug 1 '42 The Baltimore Burnt-Eyes • Herbert Ravenel Sass • ss; illus. John Alan Maxwell
 Interior Artwork; The Country Gentleman Oct '42 Biography • Will F. Jenkins • ss; illus. John Alan Maxwell
 Interior Artwork; Woman's Home Companion Sep '44 A Curse on Thee, Cordelia • Helen Strass • ss; illus. John Alan Maxwell
 Interior Artwork; Woman's Home Companion Aug '45 A Pair of Wings • Edita Morris • ss; illus. John Alan Maxwell
 Interior Artwork; The American Magazine Jan '48 Flight into Spring • Bianca Bradbury • ss; illus. John Alan Maxwell
 Collier's Magazine December 10, 1927 Edgar Ain't Wuth It a short story by Ernest Poole. Illustrated by John Alan Maxwell.
 Collier's Magazine December 24, 1927 A Way With Women a short story by John B. Kennedy with illustrations by John Alan Maxwell
 Garden City, N.Y., Doubleday, 1957. The gentleman from Indianapolis; a treasury of Booth Tarkington, edited by John Beecroft. Illustrated by John Alan Maxwell

FilmThe Lovelies of John Alan Maxwell'', a film based on Maxwell's years in New York, premiered February 23, 2013 at the Bijou Theatre in Knoxville, Tennessee. The film was written, directed, and produced by Maxwell's great nephew, Douglas Stuart McDaniel.

Exhibitions

"John Alan Maxwell: Illustrator of Romance" Exhibition of works by Maxwell at the Carroll Reece Museum. January–April, 2009.  Exhibition included works Maxwell illustrated for Steinbeck, Tarkington, Buck, Conan Doyle, curated by Douglas Stuart McDaniel and Reece Museum staff 

"The Lovelies of John Alan Maxwell" Exhibition of works by Maxwell at the Carroll Reece Museum. April–July 2014.  Artist John Alan Maxwell was known for his classical book and magazine illustrations for authors such as Pearl Buck, John Steinbeck and Ernest Hemingway. This exhibit examines Maxwell's under appreciated mastery of the human form. Esquire Magazine once described Maxwell's portrayals of nudes as "dangerous." Included in the exhibition is an ongoing screening of the documentary film, The Lovelies of John Alan Maxwell. Curated by Douglas Stuart McDaniel and Reece Museum staff  ArtFacts

References

External links
 1. Askart: John Alan Maxwell
 2. Society of Illustrators
 3. Rafael Sabatini
 4. History of the Tenth Street Studio

1904 births
Art Students League of New York alumni
1984 deaths
Artists from Roanoke, Virginia
People from Johnson City, Tennessee
Corcoran School of the Arts and Design alumni
Artists from Tennessee